Natyakendra  is a Bengali theatre group. It was formed in 1990, and led by renowned actor/director Tariq Anam Khan, Natyakendra, with its unique and distinctive plays has added a new dimension to Bangladesh theatre.Natyakendra has been in the forefront of Bangladesh theatre, and has produced world class plays since establishment.

Plays 
 Bichchu (That Scoundrel Scapin) Written by - Molière Directed ; by - Tariq Anam Khan
 Tughlaq Written by - Girish Karnad; Directed by - Tariq Anam Khan
 Sukh (Marital Bliss) Written by - Abdul Monem Selim ; Directed by - Tariq Anam Khan
 Jera (Interrogation) Written by - Farid Kamil ; Directed by - Tariq Anam Khan
 Hayavadan Written by - Girish Karnad ; Directed by - Touqir Ahmed
 The Crucible Written by - Arthur Miller ; Directed by - Tariq Anam Khan
 Aroj Choritamrito Written by - Masum Reza ; Directed by - Tariq Anam Khan
 Protisoron Written & Directed by - Tauquir Ahmed 
 Projapati (The Matchmaker) Written by - Thornton Wilder ; Directed by - Tariq Anam Khan
 Dalimkumar Written by - Subhashish Sinha ; Directed by - Yusuf Hassan
 Dui Je Chhilo Ek Chakor (A Servant of Two Masters) Written by - Carlo Goldoni ; Directed by - Tariq Anam Khan

References 

Theatre companies in Bangladesh
1990 establishments in Bangladesh